Piazza del Duomo is a city square in San Gimignano, Italy.

Buildings around the square
Palazzo vecchio del Podestà
Torre Rognosa
Torre Chigi
Torri dei Salvucci
Palazzo Comunale, San Gimignano
Loggia del Comune
Torre Grossa

Piazzas in San Gimignano